Gabriel Díaz may refer to:

Gabriel Díaz (footballer) (born 1989), Argentine footballer
Gabriel Díaz Bessón (1590–1638), Spanish composer
Gabriel Díaz Vara Calderón (1621–1676), Spanish bishop
Gabriel Díaz Berbel (1940–2011), Spanish politician

See also
Gabriela Díaz (born 1981), Argentine cyclist
Gabriel Dias (disambiguation)